Ajjenahalli, Sira  is a village in the southern state of Karnataka, India. It is located in the Sira taluk of Tumkur district in Karnataka.

See also
 Tumkur
 Districts of Karnataka

References

External links
 http://Tumkur.nic.in/

Villages in Tumkur district